George McGinnis (born 1950) is an American retired basketball player.

George McGinnis may also refer to:

George Francis McGinnis (1826–1910), United States general
George Washington McGinnis, known as Jumbo McGinnis (1854–1934), American baseball pitcher

See also
McGinnis